Amanda Simard is the former MPP for Glengarry—Prescott—Russell in the Legislative Assembly of Ontario in the 42nd Parliament of Ontario. Simard was elected in the 2018 provincial election as a member of the Progressive Conservative Party of Ontario, but left the PC caucus on November 29, 2018 after Ontario premier Doug Ford eliminated the province's French-language services commissioner and cancelled plans for a new French language university. On January 16, 2020, Simard joined the Ontario Liberal Party. She lost her seat in the 2022 Ontario general election.

During the 2022 provincial election Simard was defeated by Stéphane Sarrazin.

She is president of the International Network of Young Parliamentarians.

Early life
Simard grew up in Embrun, Ontario, in her riding, where she lives along with her family, who have been there for centuries. She worked throughout her high school, college, and university years, and worked full-time while simultaneously attending law school full-time. She held down two jobs in high school and paid her own way through law school, graduating from the University of Ottawa Faculty of Law in 2013. After graduating from law school, her intention to run for public office postponed plans to get called to the bar in Ontario.

Simard was part of the Senate Page Program from 2009 to 2010 and continued to work at the Senate of Canada as an Executive Assistant and Policy Advisor to Senators from 2010 to 2017.

Simard was elected as a municipal councillor in the Township of Russell in 2014. During her time on council, she was the Chair of the Public Library Board, the Parks, Recreation and Culture Advisory Committee and the ad hoc Recreation Complex Committee. She ceased holding municipal office upon her election to the Legislative Assembly of Ontario in 2018.

Simard is fluently bilingual in French and English.

Legislative career
She served as Parliamentary Assistant to the Minister of Francophone Affairs. On December 4, 2017, Simard was acclaimed as the Ontario PC candidate for Glengarry Prescott Russell after another nominee, Derek Duval, was disallowed by the party executive. Simard left the Ontario PC Party on November 29, 2018, to sit as an independent when Premier Doug Ford eliminated the province's French-language services commissioner and cancelled plans for a French-language university. She was praised for defence of her fellow Franco-Ontarians including by a unanimous resolution of the National Assembly of Quebec.

On January 16, 2020, Simard joined the Ontario Liberal Party. She was also selected as the Ontario Liberal Party candidate for the 2022 provincial elections. This nomination was defended by interim leader John Fraser but opposed by former riding MPP Jean-Marc Lalonde. On May 8, 2020, she was named the Ontario Liberal Party Critic for Francophone Affairs, Agriculture, Food and Rural Affairs, Heritage, Sport, Tourism and Culture Industries, and Small Business and Red Tape Reduction.

Election results

References

External links
 

1989 births
21st-century Canadian politicians
21st-century Canadian women politicians
Canadian women lawyers
Franco-Ontarian people
Lawyers in Ontario
Living people
Ontario municipal councillors
Progressive Conservative Party of Ontario MPPs
Ontario Liberal Party MPPs
Women MPPs in Ontario
Independent MPPs in Ontario
Women municipal councillors in Canada